Gang Yun-seong (? - December 1358) was a civilian of the Korean kingdom of Goryeo. He was a father of Queen Sindeok who was the second wife of King Taejo of Joseon or known as Yi Seong-gye.

Biography
After he failed in Imperial examination in the time of Chunghye of Goryeo, he became a member of Hanlin Academy and constitute a major force in Goryeo regime. One of the reason why Taejo of Joseon married  a daughter of Gang Yun-Seong was to build a foothold of the central political circle because Taejo of Joseon originally from local clan.

Family line
Gang Chung was a son of Gang Ho-gyeong, who was the 67th descendant of Gang Hou. Gang Hou was the second child of Gang Shu who was from Zingzhao country, Shangxi province in China. He had three children named I-Jegeon, Bo-Seung, and Gang Bo Yuk. Gang Bo Yuk married with his niece Gang Deju and their daughter Gang Sin-ui was born. Gang Sin-ui married with Chinese man and King Uijo of Goryeo was born. The father of King Uijo was royal family from Tang dynasty, China. According to Pyeonnyeon-Tong-Long (:ko:편년통록) and Goryeosa jeolyo (:ko:고려사절요), he was Emperor Suzong of Tang. In Pyeonnyeongangmog, Emperor Xuānzong of Tang was father of King Uijo.

When his father visited Silla, King Uijo of Goryeo was born between his Chinese father and Gang Sin-ui who was a daughter of Gang Bo Yuk. On the way of finding his father to China, King Uijo met Queen Wonchang and get married with her. According to Record of Seongwon, Queen Wonchang was a daughter of Tou En Dian Jiao Gan from Ping state (:zh:平州刺史部), China. Queen Wonchang gave birth of a boy. His name was Wang Ryung and his son was the founder of Goryeo, Taejo of Goryeo.

According to Korean history book like Goryeosa and Pyeonnyeon-Tong-Long, Gang Yun-Seong was 6 generation descent of Gang Chiyon who was 14 generation descent of Gang Ho-gyeong the oldest ancestor of Taejo of Goryeo.

Family
 Great-Grandfather
 Kang Deuk-ham (강득함, 康得咸)
 Grandfather
 Kang Suk-jae (강숙재, 康淑才)
 Father
 Kang Seo (강서, 康庶) (1347 - 1424)
 Mother
 Lady Hwang of the Jangsu Hwang clan (장수 황씨)
 Siblings
 Older brother: Kang Yun-gwi (강윤귀, 康允貴)
 Younger brother: Kang Yun-chung (강윤충, 康允忠)
 Younger brother: Kang Yun-ui (강윤의, 康允誼)
 Younger brother: Kang Yun-hwi (강윤휘, 康允暉)
 Nephew: Kang Yeong (강영, 康永)
 Nephew: Kang Woo (강우, 康祐)
 Younger brother: Kang Yun-bu (강윤부, 康允富)
 Wife: Internal Princess Consort Jinsan of the Jinju Kang clan (증 진산부부인 진주 강씨, 晉山府夫人 晉州 姜氏)
 Father-in-law: Kang Eun (강은, 姜誾)
 Issue
 Son: Kang Gye-Gwon (강계권, 康繼權) (? - 1413)
 Son: Kang Yu-Gwon (강유권, 康有權)
 Granddaughter: Lady Kang of the Goksan Kang clan (곡산 강씨, 谷山 康氏)
 Grandson-in-law: Yi Sang-hang (이상항, 李尙恒)
Daughter: Queen Shindeok of the Goksan Kang clan (12 July 1356 - 15 September 1396) (신덕왕후 강씨)
 Son-in-law: Yi Dan, King Taejo of Joseon (27 October 1335 – 18 June 1408) (조선 태조)
 Granddaughter: Princess Gyeongsun (? – 8 September 1407) (경순공주)
 Grandson: Yi Bang-Beon, Grand Prince Muan (1381 – 6 October 1398) (이방번 무안대군)
 Grandson: Yi Bang-Seok, Grand Prince Uian (1382 – 6 October 1398) (이방석 의안대군)

References

Sources

14th-century Korean people
Sincheon Kang clan